Ndukwe is a surname and given name. Notable people with the name include:

Surname

Chinedum Ndukwe (born 1985), American football safety
Ernest Ndukwe (born 1948), Nigerian electrical engineer and telecommunications director
Ijeoma Ndukwe-Egwuronu (born 1982), Nigerian entrepreneur
Ikechuku Ndukwe (born 1982), American football offensive lineman

Given name
Kalu Ndukwe Kalu (born 1954), Nigerian-American political scientist